Rauf Hassan is a Kurdish writer who was born in 1945 in the city of Sulaymaniyah in the Iraqi Kurdistan.

He was imprisoned during the rule of the Ba'ath Party regime, because of his critical articles he wrote against the Ba'ath Party regime in Iraq. He is also conspired as one of the primary writers  for revolution in Iraqi Kurdistan.

An accomplished linguist, he also founded the Kurdish Dialog Center.  He has two sons  Zana Rauf (b 1970)  and Shero Rauf (b 1979).

Works

Astronomy
 Gardoon (1967) ... Universe

Short stories and Novels

 Chakara (1973) ... Short Story
 Sbaine Bawkt Detawa (1979) ... Your father will be back tomorrow - Short Stories
 Darzi Azhni Khamakan (1988)... Preface - Critics
 Wenakai Khushkt (1999) .... Your sister's photo - Short Stories

 Khori Tar or  Kochi Sur (1999).... The Darkness sun  or Red Departuer - Novel
 Cheman… Koleltrin Shazadai Jihan (2018).... Cheman… Saddest Princess in the World - Novel

Journalism
 Alfa u Betay Rozhnamagari (1999).... The Journalism Alphabet .
 Govary Rojnamawany u Halsangandnek (2006) ... Journalism Magazine and a description .
 La bainman darnachet ... Special lines in several  magazines and newspaper that continue for more than 23 years.
 Hawalneri Telefizioni ... TV Journalist (2011)

Plays
 Janaby Mufatish ... Translation - stageplay
 Aw Piawai bu ba Sag ... The man who become a Dog  Translation - stageplay
 Charanusi mrov ... The destiny of a Human  - Translation - stageplay
 Zyani Tutn ... Danger of Tobacco stageplay
 Khwardngay Mimuni zindoo ... Living monkeys Restaurant  stageplay
 Paikar .... The Statue ... stageplay
 Malai sar grdaka .... Mala from the top of the Hill ... Translation TV Stageplay
 Didari Sarak Komar (2004) ... Meeting with the President  - Short Stories For stageplay

1- Kaligola la awenay amro da  ... Caligula before today's mirror
 
2- Komediai bargi afsunawi ... The Comedy of the magic costume

3- Hawaldz ... The Spy

4- Mroveki assayi ... Normal Human Being

5- Nawrozi alkan

6- Didari sarok komar ... Meeting of the president

Translations
 Tiori Nisbi (1984) ... theory of relativity by Albert Einstein  - Translation
 Hunari Jang (2004)... The Art of War  by  Sun Tzu   - Translation
 Sofigareti Nikos Kazantzakis (2005) - Culture - Translation
 Ktebi dwhami "Taw" - Second book of Taw (2005) - Translation
 Kurdnasi  (2006)  - Culture - Translation

Interview with Rauf Hassan
 Marks u marksizmi Kurdi u Ayin (2007)  ... Marx, Kurdish Marxism and  Religion  - Culture
 Keshai afratan u bzutnawai zhnan (2008) .. Female problems and women activity ..  from P:673 to P:714  - Interview

Literary criticism
 Krekar u Chiroki Kurdi (1982) ... Workers and Kurdish Stories
 Andesha Jwanakani roh la Chiroki kurdida (2005) ... The Beautiful fantasy of soul in Kurdish story  - Culture
 Xulyay meymune spiyekan la chiroki kurdida (2007) ... Habits of the white Monkeys in Kurdish stories   - Culture
 Andesha Jwanakani roh la shieri kurdida (2007) ... The Beautiful fantasy of soul in Kurdish poem  - Culture

Television
 Telefzioni Harem ... Harem Television  -  Director Cameraman Manager
 Ktebi Hafta ... Book of the week - television host program
 Govari Roshnbiry ... Culture Magazin in  Karkuk TV
 Haftay baseki hunari ... Every week and an Art discussion ...

References

1945 births
Living people
Iraqi Kurdish people
Kurdish-language writers
People from Sulaymaniyah
Iraqi television directors
Kurdish journalists
Iraqi journalists
Iraqi screenwriters
Iraqi mass media people
20th-century Iraqi writers
21st-century Iraqi writers
People buried in Saiwan Cemetery